Grimsburg is an upcoming American animated sitcom created by Catlan McClelland and Matthew Schlissel for the Fox Broadcasting Company. In October 2022, ahead of its premiere, the series was renewed for a second season.

Premise
The series takes place in the fictional town of Grimsburg, where detective Marvin Flute may be the greatest detective, but can't figure out his own family.

Cast

Main
Jon Hamm as Marvin Flute

Production
In October 2021, Fox ordered the series as a straight-to-series order.

In October 2022, Fox renewed the series for a second season, ahead of its premiere.

References

External links
 
 

2020s American animated comedy television series
2020s American adult animated television series
2020s American sitcoms

American animated sitcoms
American adult animated comedy television series
American flash adult animated television series
Animated detective television series
Animated television series about families
English-language television shows
Fox Broadcasting Company original programming
Television series by Fox Entertainment
Upcoming animated television series